Kulva Eldership is a Lithuanian eldership, located in a western part of Jonava District Municipality. As of 2020, administrative centre and largest settlement within eldership was Kulva.

Geography
 Rivers: Juodmena, Neris, Šlėna, Barupė, Lankesa;
 Protected areas: Kulva Geomorphological Sanctuary;
 Eskers: Kulva esker;

Populated places 
Following settlements are located in the Kulva Eldership (as for 2011 census):

Villages: Aukštigaliai, Batėgala, Bešiai, Čičinai, Čiūdai, Daigučiai, Dijokiškiai, Gineikiai, Gureliai, Jonkučiai, Kulva, Kurmagala, Laikiškiai, Mardošiškiai, Marvilius, Mažieji Žinėnai, Melnytėlė, Mykoliškiai, Naujasodis, Pabartoniai, Pakapė, Paupė, Preišiogalėlė, Ragožiai, Rimkai, Ručiūnai, Sangailiškiai, Skrebinai, Smičkiai, Šabūniškiai, Šmatai, Trakai, Vanagiškiai, Varnutė, Vešeikiai, Virbalai, Žinėnai

Demography

References

Elderships in Jonava District Municipality